In the theory of formal languages, the interchange lemma states a necessary condition for a language to be context-free, just like the pumping lemma for context-free languages.

The first application of the interchange lemma was to show that the set of repetitive strings (i.e., strings of the form  with ) over an alphabet of three or more characters is not context-free.

See also 
 Pumping lemma for regular languages

References 
 

Formal languages
Lemmas